Gerard van Leur (9 June 1917 – 14 December 1979) was a Dutch footballer. He played in one match for the Netherlands national football team in 1938.

References

External links
 

1917 births
1979 deaths
Dutch footballers
Netherlands international footballers
Place of birth missing
Association footballers not categorized by position